The Asbury Park Press is a daily newspaper in Monmouth and Ocean counties of New Jersey and has the third largest circulation in the state. It has been owned by Gannett since 1997.

Its reporting staff has been awarded numerous national honors in journalism, including the Selden Ring Award for Investigative Reporting, two the Associated Press Managing Editors' Award for Public Service, the National Headliner Award for Public Service and two National Headliner Awards for Best Series (large papers). The Press investigative team was a finalist for the 2010 Pulitzer Prize in Public Service.
The newspaper was also the home to editorial cartoonist Steve Breen when he won the Pulitzer Prize in that category in 1998.

Awards

The Asbury Park Press has a history of winning national awards for its public service and investigative reporting. Its editorial cartoonist Steve Breen won the Pulitzer Prize for Editorial Cartooning in 1998 and the newspaper was a finalist for the Pulitzer Public Service Gold Medal in 2010.

References

External links

Asbury Park Press official site
Mobile website

Newspapers published in New Jersey
Gannett publications
Asbury Park, New Jersey
Asbury Park Press people
Newspapers established in 1879
1879 establishments in New Jersey